Markus Stenz (born 28 February 1965, Bad Neuenahr-Ahrweiler, Rhineland-Palatinate) is a German conductor.  He studied at the Hochschule für Musik Köln with Volker Wangenhein and at Tanglewood with Leonard Bernstein and Seiji Ozawa.

Stenz has served as Artistic Director of the Montepulciano Festival (1989–1995), and Principal Conductor of the London Sinfonietta (1994–1998).  In Australia, from 1998 to 2004, he was Artistic Director and Chief Conductor of the Melbourne Symphony Orchestra (MSO), which he took on their first European tour in 2000.  Stenz is known for his championing of contemporary composers, which included the appointment of Brett Dean as the MSO's composer-in-residence in 2001.

Stenz was Principal Conductor of the Gürzenich Orchestra (Gürzenich-Kapellmeister) from 2003 to 2014.  During his tenure, beginning in October 2005, concerts of the Gürzenich Orchestra have been recorded live on their own label "GO live!" and made available within 5 minutes of the end of the concert the same night for purchase by audience members.  Stenz conducted the Gürzenich Orchestra's first concert appearance at The Proms in August 2008.

In February 2008, Stenz was named principal guest conductor of the Hallé Orchestra, the second principal guest conductor in the orchestra's history.  He held this post from 2009 to 2014.  In August 2010, the Radio Filharmonisch Orkest (RFO) announced the appointment of Stenz as its eighth chief conductor, effective with the 2012–2013 season, with an initial contract of 3 years.  Stenz concluded his RFO chief conductorship as of the close of the 2018–2019 season.  In July 2014, the Baltimore Symphony Orchestra announced the appointment of Stenz as its next principal guest conductor, as of the 2015–2016 season, with an initial contract of 3 years.  In September 2016, Stenz was appointed as conductor-in-residence of the Seoul Philharmonic Orchestra, effective January 2017, with a contract of 3 years.

Stenz is noted as a conductor of the operas of Hans Werner Henze.  His conducting debut at the La Fenice theatre in Venice was with a production of Henze's Elegy for Young Lovers.  Stenz has also led the premieres of other Henze operas, including Das verratene Meer (Deutsche Oper, Berlin), Venus und Adonis (Bavarian State Opera, Munich) and L'Upupa und der Triumph der Sohnesliebe (2003 Salzburg Festival).

Stenz is a Fellow of the Royal Northern College of Music.

Discography 
In addition to his recordings with the Gürzenich Orchestra, Stenz made his first recording with the Royal Concertgebouw Orchestra in premieres of works by Moritz Eggert, Colin Matthews, Theo Verbey and Detlev Glanert. Further recordings include Helmut Lachenmann's Ausklang and Strauss' An Alpine Symphony with the Ensemble Modern Orchestra, Karl Amadeus Hartmann's Simplicius Simplicissimus, and Henze's Symphony No. 8 and other pieces with the Gürzenich Orchestra. Stenz and the Gürzenich Orchestra have recorded a series of the music of Gustav Mahler for Oehms Classics, and recordings of Richard Strauss and Arnold Schoenberg for Hyperion Records.

Awards and nominations

ARIA Music Awards
The ARIA Music Awards are presented annually from 1987 by the Australian Recording Industry Association (ARIA). 

! 
|-
| 2014
| Ades Polaris / Stanhope Piccolo Concerto (with Andrew Macleod, Melbourne Symphony Orchestra & Benjamin Northey])
| Best Classical Album
| 
| 
|-

References

External links
 Official homepage of Markus Stenz
 Royal Northern College of Music, Honorary Members
 John Quinn, MusicWebInternational review of Markus Stenz recordings of Mahler for Oehmns, 12 October 2012
 Interview with Markus Stenz, November 10, 1997

1965 births
Living people
People from Bad Neuenahr-Ahrweiler
German male conductors (music)
Hochschule für Musik und Tanz Köln alumni
21st-century German conductors (music)
21st-century German male musicians